Deryn Bowser (born April 3, 1987) is a former arena football player.

Early life
Born the son of M. Dean and Deborah D. Bowser, Deryn attended Washington Preparatory High School in Los Angeles, California.

College career

Los Angeles Harbor College
After high school, Bowser attended Los Angeles Harbor College, where he was a standout member of the football team. Bowser was twice named First Team All-Western State Conference and set school records for career receptions (109) and receiving touchdowns (19).

Bowser signed with Akron on January 29, 2008. Bowser chose Akron over scholarship offers from Kansas State, Oregon State and Stony Brook.

Akron
Bowser started 16 games in his career for the Zips. Bowser was named 3rd Team All-Mid-American Conference in 2008. Bowser was having a productive 2009 season when he was injured during the Zips week 6 game against Buffalo.

Statistics
Source:

Professional career

Pre-draft
Prior to the 2010 NFL Draft, Bowser was projected to be undrafted by NFLDraftScout.com. He was rated as the 164th-best wide receiver in the draft. He was not invited to the NFL Scouting Combine, he posted the following numbers during his Akron pro-day workouts:

Arizona Cardinals
After failing to hear his named called in the 2010 NFL Draft, Bowser signed as an undrafted free agent with the Arizona Cardinals. He was waived on August 3, 2010.

Iowa Barnstormers
In 2012, Bowser was assigned to the Iowa Barnstormers of the Arena Football League. Bowser suffered a knee injury during 2012 training camp, and missed the entire 2012 season. Bowser was assigned to the Barnstormers on November 2, 2012 for the 2013 season.

References

External links
Akron Zips Bio

1987 births
Living people
American football wide receivers
Akron Zips football players
Iowa Barnstormers players
Los Angeles Harbor Seahawks football players